Royal Magazine is a bi-monthly, premier lifestyle publication geared towards urban Indian men. It is independently published by Anoop Verma. Royal features a mix of fashion, grooming, entertainment, women, travel destinations, and technology. Notable interviews include Bollywood actress Kareena Kapoor, Bollywood director Farhan Akhtar, Hollywood actress Indira Varma, rapper Hard Kaur, and real estate mogul Snehal Mantri.

History and profile
The premiere issue was launched in April 2007 in Bangalore, India. It is the only magazine in the world to feature nude Indian women on a regular basis. For this reason there was controversy in the initial months of operation. Distributors were hesitant to show the magazine openly or sell to women.

Known women to feature fully nude in the magazine and or their website include Jody Waraich, Livvy Lars, Minnie Gupta, Priya Rai, Kerie Hart, Simron Singh, Sarmi Karati, Sunny Leone, Maushmi Udeshi, Shabana De, and Natasha Khan.

References

2007 establishments in Karnataka
Men's magazines published in India
Magazines established in 2007
Mass media in Bangalore
Bi-monthly magazines published in India